Freddie George Bishop III (born February 25, 1990) is a gridiron football defensive lineman who is a free agent. He played college football at Western Michigan University. He first enrolled at Robichaud High School before transferring to Airport High School in Carleton, Michigan. He has also been a member of the New York Jets, Calgary Stampeders, Memphis Express, and Toronto Argonauts.

Early years
Bishop first played high school football at Robichaud High School. He earned all-city honors as a freshman and sophomore in 2004 and 2005. He earned All-Mega Conference honors in 2005 and was named Team Defensive Most Valuable Player in 2004. He transferred to Airport High School in Carleton, Michigan and earned All-Huron League honors in 2007 and was named first-team all-state as a senior. He also received Honorable Mention All-Huron League honors in 2006.

College career
Bishop played for the Western Michigan Broncos from 2009 to 2012. He was redshirted in 2008. He was named Second-team All-MAC and was the Broncos' outstanding team player after starting all 12 games, recording 63 tackles, including 11.5 tackles for loss and four sacks in 2012. He was also named Third-team All-MAC Defensive End in 2011.

Professional career

Detroit Lions
Bishop signed with the Detroit Lions on May 14, 2013 after going undrafted in the 2013 NFL Draft. He was released by the Lions on June 26, 2013.

Calgary Stampeders
Bishop was signed to the Calgary Stampeders' practice roster on July 16, 2013. Bishop, seeing significant playing time due to an earlier injury to Charleston Hughes, recorded five tackles and a sack in the Stampeders win against the Hamilton Tiger-Cats in the 102nd Grey Cup.

New York Jets
Bishop signed with the New York Jets on February 5, 2016. On September 3, 2016, he was released by the Jets as part of final roster cuts and was signed to the practice squad the next day. He was promoted to the active roster on December 10, 2016.

On September 3, 2017, Bishop was waived by the Jets and was signed to the practice squad the next day. He was promoted to the active roster on September 16, 2017. He was waived on September 21, 2017 and later re-signed to the practice squad on October 4, 2017. He was promoted back to the active roster on October 7, 2017. On October 8, 2017, against the Cleveland Browns, he recovered a fumble.

On June 7, 2018, Bishop was waived by the Jets.

Detroit Lions (Second Stint)
On July 23, 2018, Bishop signed with the Detroit Lions. He was waived on September 1, 2018.

Memphis Express
Bishop signed with the Memphis Express of the Alliance of American Football on February 27, 2019.

Toronto Argonauts
After the AAF ceased operations in April 2019, Bishop signed with the Toronto Argonauts on May 22, 2019.

Saskatchewan Roughriders
Bishop signed with the Saskatchewan Roughriders on December 29, 2020. On July 8, 2021, Bishop tore his Achilles' tendon in a workout ahead of training camp. He was placed on the injured list on July 14.

References

External links
Just Sports Stats
Calgary Stampeders bio
CFL profile

Living people
1990 births
American football defensive linemen
Canadian football defensive linemen
African-American players of American football
African-American players of Canadian football
Western Michigan Broncos football players
Detroit Lions players
Calgary Stampeders players
New York Jets players
Players of American football from Michigan
People from Inkster, Michigan
Memphis Express (American football) players
Toronto Argonauts players
Saskatchewan Roughriders players
21st-century African-American sportspeople